Sulzberg or Sulzburg may refer to:

Sulzberg, Austria, a municipality in Vorarlberg, Austria
Sulzberg, Oberallgäu, a municipality in Oberallgäu, Germany 
Sulzberg (Bavaria), a mountain in the Bavarian Alps, Germany
Sulzberg (Lower Bavaria), a mountain in Bavaria, Germany
Sulzberg (Vorarlberg), a mountain in the Vorarlberg district, Austria
Sulzberg, a Swiss Heritage Site in Untereggen, St. Gallen, Switzerland
Sulzburg, a city in Breisgau-Hochschwarzwald, Baden-Württemberg, Germany